Thermoelectric power may refer to:
Rate of change of the thermoelectromotive force of a thermocouple with temperature
 Electric power generated from a heat source, such as burning fossil fuel-coal, oil, indirectly through devices like steam turbines
 The thermopower, or Seebeck coefficient, of a material, which governs its thermoelectric properties (a misnomer, as this quantity has units of voltage per unit temperature)
 The power output of a thermoelectric generator that uses the Seebeck effect
 Radioisotope thermoelectric generator

See also
 Thermal power station